The City of Greenwood Village is a home rule municipality located in Arapahoe County, Colorado, United States. The city population was 15,691 at the 2020 United States Census. Greenwood Village is a part of the Denver–Aurora–Lakewood, CO Metropolitan Statistical Area and the Front Range Urban Corridor.

History
The town was named for the Greenwood Ranch. It was developed during the 1860s when settlers came from the East and Midwest looking for gold. By the early 1900s, it had become a farming community.

Geography
At the 2020 United States Census, the town had a total area of  including  of water.

Demographics

As of the census of 2000, there were 11,035 people, 3,997 households, and 3,097 families residing in the city. The racial makeup of the city was 93.90% White, 1.14% African American, 0.19% Native American, 2.55% Asian, 0.05% Pacific Islander, 0.61% from other races, and 1.57% from two or more races. Hispanic or Latino of any race were 3.12% of the population.

There were 3,997 households, out of which 41.8% had children under the age of 18 living with them, 69.8% were married couples living together, 5.7% had a female householder with no husband present, and 22.5% were non-families. 17.5% of all households were made up of individuals, and 3.3% had someone living alone who was 65 years of age or older.  The average household size was 2.75 and the average family size was 3.15. Greenwood Village resides within the Cherry Creek School District.  West Middle School and Campus Middle School feed Cherry Creek High School.

In the city, the population was spread out, with 29.7% under the age of 18, 5.0% from 18 to 24, 23.9% from 25 to 44, 32.3% from 45 to 64, and 9.1% who were 65 years of age or older.  The median age was 41 years. For every 100 females, there were 100.6 males.  For every 100 females age 18 and over, there were 97.5 males.

The median income for a household in the city was $116,147, and the median income for a family was $145,802. Males had a median income of $99,088 versus $41,991 for females. The per capita income for the city was $69,189.  About 1.5% of families and 1.9% of the population were below the poverty line, including 1.1% of those under age 18 and 4.1% of those age 65 or over.  To compare, the average US income for 2000 was $48,476. This places Greenwood Village #31 for highest income places in the United States with a population of at least 10,000.

Educational background for population 25 years and over in Greenwood Village:
 High school or higher: 98.5%
 Bachelor's degree or higher: 72.3%
 Graduate or professional degree: 31.2%
 Unemployed: 2.6%
 Mean travel time to work: 21.0 minutes

For population 15 years and over in Greenwood Village city
 Never married: 21.4%
 Now married: 66.5%
 Separated: 0.9%
 Widowed: 2.6%
 Divorced: 8.5%

8.3% Foreign born (2.8% Europe, 2.5% Latin America, 1.6% Asia, 1.1% North America).

Economy

Greenwood Village includes part of the Denver Technological Center (DTC). Companies currently based in Greenwood Village:
 Air Methods, in the DTC, moved there in 2017
 American Medical Response
 CoBank
 CSG International
 Empower Retirement
 Great-West
 Jacobs Engineering
 Newmont Goldcorp Corporation
 Red Robin
 RMR Colorado, LLC (Black-eyed Pea Colorado restaurants)
 Weather Nation TV
 Xanterra Parks and Resorts

Companies that were based in Greenwood Village, CO:

 Adelphia
 GapWest Broadcasting
 JD Edwards
 Molycorp
 Tele-Communications Inc.
 Weather Nation TV

First Data's headquarters were located in Greenwood Village. In 2009, First Data announced that it was moving its headquarters from Greater Denver to Greater Atlanta.

Top employers

According to the city's 2016 Comprehensive Annual Financial Report, the top employers in the city were:

Media

Education
Cherry Creek School District is based in Greenwood Village.
Metropolitan State University of Denver has a satellite campus.
Regis University has a satellite campus.

Entertainment
Greenwood Village is the site of the Fiddler's Green Amphitheatre, an 18,000-seat outdoor venue.

Notable people
Notable individuals who were born in or have lived in Greenwood Village include:
 Clare Gallagher (born 1992), ultra-distance runner
 Phillip S. Figa (1951–2008), U.S. federal judge
 Mike Law (born 1979), lacrosse forward
 Sam Raben (born 1997), soccer player
 Brian Watson (born 1971), entrepreneur, author, and politician

See also

Colorado
Bibliography of Colorado
Index of Colorado-related articles
Outline of Colorado
List of counties in Colorado
List of municipalities in Colorado
List of places in Colorado
List of statistical areas in Colorado
Front Range Urban Corridor
North Central Colorado Urban Area
Denver-Aurora, CO Combined Statistical Area
Denver-Aurora-Lakewood, CO Metropolitan Statistical Area
Arrest of Robert Seacat

References

External links

City of Greenwood Village website
CDOT map of the City of Greenwood Village

 
Cities in Arapahoe County, Colorado
Cities in Colorado